Promot was a motorcycle and race car manufacturer based in Warsaw, Poland, that operated from 1967 to 1986. It belonged to Ośrodek Techniczno–Zaopatrzeniowy. Promot manufactured competition, rally, and motocross motorcycles, as well as a open-wheel cars.

History 

Promot was operated by Ośrodek Techniczno–Zaopatrzeniowy based in Warsaw, Poland. It manufactured competition, rally, (Junior 250) and motocross (MR and MC) motorcycles with 175, 250, and 300 cm³ engines. In 1967, it manufactured its first open-wheel race car, Promot-Rak 67. In 1970 it began development of the prototype racing cars for Formula Polonia. The first car for that series was Promot Polonia I, which manufacture began in 1974. In 1979 the company presented the next series of that car, Promot II, which could race in Formula Polonia and Formula Easter races. In 1984, it presented the third series of the car, Promot III, which was manufactured until 1986,and was the last open-wheel car manufactured by a Polish-based company. In total 62 Promot cars had been manufactured.

Vehicle models

Motorcycles 
 Promot Junior 250
 Promot MC
 Promot MR
 Promot NC 125

Race cars 
 Promot-Rak 67
 Promot Polonia I
 Promot II
 Promot III

Citations

References

Bibliography 
 Robert Steć: Polskie samochody wyścigowe. Opole: Studio ConTEXT, 2011, ISBN 978-83-930306-4-4.
 Mała Encyklopedia Sportu, Warsaw: Wydawnictwo Sport i Turystyka, 1984

Motorcycle manufacturers of Poland
Car brands
Racecar constructors
Car manufacturers of Poland
Defunct manufacturing companies of Poland
Manufacturing companies based in Warsaw